Kalem Mama (Call Mama) is a 2003 Egyptian romantic comedy film written by Mostafa El Sobki and directed by Ahmad Awwadh.

Synopsis
A young girl named Muna continues her studies after the tragic loss of her father. She meets Sayed, a man with whom she becomes romantically inclined and wants to get married. Muna's mother does not approve of their upcoming marriage because he has not finished his studies and thinks of Sayed as a failure. Muna and her four girl friends take on the obstacles her mother sets forth in order to continue their love, and endure a variety of ups and downs throughout the voyage.

Cast
 Mai Ezzidine   
 Maha Ahmed
 Hassan Hosny
 Abla Kamel
 Tamer Samir
 Menna Shalabi
 Ahmed Zaher
 Talaat Zakaria

Production
The project was filmed during late 2002 in Cairo.

Reception

References

External links
 Kallem mama at the Internet Movie Database

2003 films
2003 romantic comedy films
Egyptian romantic comedy films